Lubliner Sztyme ("Lublin Voice") was a Yiddish-language weekly newspaper in interbellum Poland, published in Lublin. Lubliner Sztyme was an organ of the General Jewish Labour Bund in Poland.

References

General Jewish Labour Bund in Poland
Defunct newspapers published in Poland
History of Lublin
Mass media in Lublin
Publications with year of establishment missing
Publications with year of disestablishment missing
Socialism in Poland
Yiddish-language mass media in Poland
Yiddish socialist newspapers
Weekly newspapers published in Poland
Jews and Judaism in Lublin